The Spellcaster's Bible is a 1979 role-playing game supplement published by The Playing Board.

Contents
The Spellcaster's Bible is a sourcebook with 160 spells intended to be used for any fantasy role-playing game in which characters have experience levels and classes.

Reception
Ron Shigeta reviewed The Spellcaster's Bible in The Space Gamer No. 31. Shigeta commented that "The Spellcaster's Bible appears to be another example of a product that has been released without thorough playtesting or thought, and is with few exceptions, not very useful."

References

Fantasy role-playing game supplements
Role-playing game supplements introduced in 1979